Antirhea sintenisii is a species of plant in the family Rubiaceae. It is endemic to Puerto Rico.

References
 

sinten
Endemic flora of Puerto Rico
Vulnerable plants
Taxonomy articles created by Polbot
Taxobox binomials not recognized by IUCN